Jenny Wood-Allen MBE (20 November 1911 – 30 December 2010) was a Scottish marathon runner and Guinness World Record holder, running in over 30 marathons since 1983 and earning more than £70,000 for charity.

Career
Hailing from Dundee, Scotland, Wood-Allen initially took up sport in 1983 as a "one-off". Wood-Allen made national headlines across the UK when she was 87 years old after completing the 1999 London Marathon. Her time of 7hours 14mins 46secs, earned her the current Guinness World Record for Oldest Female Marathon Finisher.

In 2001, Wood-Allen ran for the last time in the London Marathon before walking it once more in 2002, aged 90.

She received an MBE in the 2006 New Year Honours List, and took part in the 2006 Great Scottish Walk.

In December 2006, she made the headlines when £700 worth of jewellery was stolen from her home.

From 2007, she was still very active in sport, running up to 50 miles a week, and regularly appearing at meetings of the Dundee City Sports Council.

Jenny Wood-Allen died on 30 December 2010, aged 99 in Dundee. Her funeral was held at the parish church of Douglas, Dundee on 12 January 2011, and she was cremated at Dundee Crematorium.

References

External links
 ABC News – Keep on running
 Run for your wife, BBC news, 16 April 1999

1911 births
2010 deaths
Sportspeople from Dundee
British female marathon runners
Scottish female marathon runners
Members of the Order of the British Empire